is a Japanese voice actress and singer. She works for Aoni Production and was formerly a member of the voice actor unit Drops, which included fellow voice actor Akemi Kanda, Tomoko Kaneda, Mariko Kōda, and Ryōko Shiraishi. In high school in Fukuoka, she was head of the drama club and her ambition was to play male roles in the famous all-female Takarazuka Revue.

Personal life and career
Nonaka's initial interest in voice acting started after watching YuYu Hakusho. While self-proclaiming that she really would have preferred an acting career, but due to her height, as well as her interest in anime, she ultimately pursued voice acting after high school and graduated from the 21st batch of students from the Tokyo branch of Aoni's Seiyū Coaching School.

In December 2009, she announced both on her blog and web radio,  episode 30, that she has passed and acquired level 2 certification in aromatherapy. This was again announced while Nonaka was featured in the January 25, 2010 broadcast of Anison Plus.

Nonaka has a regular column, in monthly voice magazine, . She has been featured three times in Anison Plus since the program started on July 7, 2008 (28-Jul-2008, January 26, 2009, January 25, 2010).

On August 20, 2017, she announced both on her blog and YouTube channel that she married someone outside the voice acting business on August 16, 2017.

On December 16, 2020, it was announced that she had tested positive for COVID-19.

Filmography

Anime

2002
 Platonic Chain – Kagura Rika
 Ultimate Muscle – Keiko, Terry the Kid (young)
 Kinnikuman Nisei: Muscle Ninjin Sōdatsu! Chōjin Daisensō (movie) – Keiko

2003
 Bobobo-bo Bo-bobo – Beauty
 Bottle Fairy – Hororo
 R.O.D the TV – Touko Shigno
 Stellvia of the Universe – Shima Katase
 Submarine 707R (OVA) – Rei

2004
 Gakuen Alice – Nonoko Ogasawara
 Kannazuki no Miko – Nekoko
 Tenbatsu! Angel Rabbie (OVA) – Lui
 Kinnikuman Nisei – Ultimate Muscle – Keiko
 Doki Doki School Hours – Hanako Horie

2005
 Iriya no Sora, UFO no Natsu (OVA) – Iriya Kana
 Jinki: Extend – Satsuki Kawamoto
 Kamichu – Miko Saegusa
 Mahō Sensei Negima – Konoka Konoe
 Pani Poni Dash! – Ichijō, Ichijo's Younger Sister

2006
 Ape Escape – Sayaka
 Binchō-tan – Binchō-tan
 Kinnikuman Nisei 2 – Keiko
 Kujibiki Unbalance – Tokino Akiyama
 Negima!? – Konoka Konoe
 Negima!? OVA Haru – Konoka Konoe
 Negima!? OVA Natsu – Konoka Konoe
 Poka Poka Mori no Rascal – Riruru
 Sōkō no Strain – Lavinia Reberth and (Sara's and Ralph's) Emily

2007
 Doraemon – Doramyakko
 Clannad – Fuko Ibuki
 Gakuen Utopia Manabi Straight! – Mika Inamori
 Mushi-Uta – C
 Sayonara Zetsubō Sensei – Kafuka Fuura

2008
 Himitsu – Top Secret – Nanako Amachi
 Mahō Sensei Negima OAD – Shiroki Tsubasa Ala Alba – Konoka Konoe
 Real Drive – Yukino
 Zoku Sayonara Zetsubō Sensei – Kafuka Fuura
 Goku Sayonara Zetsubō Sensei (OVA) – Kafuka Fuura
 Toradora! – Kihara Maya
 Zettai Shougeki ~Platonic Heart~ (OVA) – Miko Kazuki

2009
 Clannad After Story – Fuko Ibuki
 Sora wo Kakeru Shōjo – Imoko Shishidou
 Asura Cryin' – Kanade Takatsuki
 Asura Cryin'2 – Kanade Takatsuki
 Mahō Sensei Negima OAD – Mou Hitotsu No Sekai – Konoka Konoe
 Natsu no Arashi! – Yayoi Fushimi
 Zan Sayonara Zetsubō Sensei – Kafuka Fuura
 Yoku Wakaru Gendai Mahō – Koyomi Morishita
 Tatakau Shisho – Chakoly Cocotte
 Tokyo Magnitude 8.0 – Aya

2010
 The World God Only Knows – Fujiidera
 Otome Yōkai Zakuro – Mugi

2011
 Ground Control to Psychoelectric Girl – Meme Touwa
 Puella Magi Madoka Magica – Kyouko Sakura
 Gintama – Pirako Chin

2012
 Another – Yukari Sakuragi
 Detective Conan: The Miracle of Excalibur (OVA) – Minae
 Saki Achiga-hen episode of Side-A – Kōko Fukuyo

2013
 Sasami-san@Ganbaranai – Tama Yagami
 Muromi-san – Hii-chan
 The World God Only Knows – Fujidera
 WataMote – Megumi Imae
 Puella Magi Madoka Magica: Rebellion – Kyouko Sakura

2014
 Amagi Brilliant Park – Tirami
 Gugure! Kokkuri-san – Noel
 Robot Girls Z – Archduke Gorgon
 Saki: The Nationals – Kōko Fukuyo

2015
 Gourmet Girl Graffiti – Akira Machiko
 One Piece – Mansherry
 Mr. Osomatsu – Chibimi
 Shōnen Hollywood -Holly Stage for 50- – Kotomi

2016
 Doraemon – Mari Marui
 Tsukiuta. The Animation – Chisa Togawa

2017
 Schoolgirl Strikers – Sasa Momokawa
 Kemono Friends – Reticulated Giraffe (episode 10, 12)
 Fate/Apocrypha – Berserker of Black/Frankenstein's Monster (episodes 1–10), Medea (episode 18)
 UQ Holder – Konoka Konoe

2018
 Fate/Extra Last Encore – Nursery Rhyme/Alice
 Gintama – Pirako Chin

2020
 Magia Record: Puella Magi Madoka Magica Side Story – Kyouko Sakura
 Dropkick on My Devil! – Kraken

2021
 Chibi Maruko-chan – Reiko-chan
 Kaginado – Fuko Ibuki

2022
 Girls' Frontline – 416

Video games
 12Riven – Myū Takae
 Another Eden – Myunfa
 Ape Escape 3 – Sayaka
 Arknights – Glaucus
 Atelier Annie: Alchemists of Sera Island – Annie Eilenberg
 Azur Lane - Honoka
 Blaze Union: Story to Reach the Future – Emilia and Pamela
 Clannad – Fuko Ibuki
 Code 18 – Hikari Haruna
 Cross Edge – Meu
 Dead or Alive 5 Last Round – Honoka
 Dead or Alive 6 – Honoka
 Dead or Alive Xtreme 3 – Honoka
 Dengeki Gakuen RPG: Cross of Venus – Kana Iriya, Kanade Takatsuki
 Dragon Ball Xenoverse – Time Patroller (Female 4)
 Dragon Ball Xenoverse 2 – Time Patroller (Female 4)
 Dynasty Warriors 7 – Bao Sanniang
 Epic Seven - Alencia
 Fate/Extra – Caster (Nursery Rhyme), Alice
 Fate/Grand Order – Mary Read, Medea [Lily], Nursery Rhyme, Frankenstein's Monster
 Final Fantasy Type-0 – Aria
 Food Fantasy (2018) – Apple Pie
 Food Girls 2: Civil War – Long’er
 Girls' Frontline – HK416
 Gloria Union – Locomoco and Pamela
 Granblue Fantasy – Karteira
 Grand Chase: Dimensional Chaser - Myung Hwarin
 Magia Record – Kyouko Sakura
 Mana Khemia: Alchemists of Al-Revis – Lene Kier
 Mega Man X: Command Mission – Cinnamon
 Memories Off: Yubikiri no Kioku – Orihime Hoshitsuki
 NieR Replicant – Yonah
 Puella Magi Madoka Magica Portable – Kyouko Sakura
 Riviera: The Promised Land – Serene
 Rune Factory: A Fantasy Harvest Moon – Tori or Torte
 Senran Kagura: Peach Beach Splash – Honoka
 Shining Force EXA – Catheana
 Shining Wind – Mao
 The King of Fighters All Star – Honoka
 The King of Fighters EX2: Howling Blood – Miu Kurosaki
 The Legend of Heroes: Trails of Cold Steel – Towa Herschel
 The Legend of Heroes: Kuro no Kiseki II – Crimson Sin – Towa Herschel
 Tokyo Xanadu – Towa Kokonoe
 Toukiden: The Age of Demons – Hatsuho
 Warriors All-Stars – Honoka
 WarTech: Senko No Ronde – Baek Changpo
 Wrestle Angels: Survivor – Cutie Kanai, Noel Shiraishi
 Xenoblade Chronicles 2 – Tora
 Xenosaga Episode II: Jenseits von Gut und Böse – 100-Series Realian
 Yakuza 5 – Azusa Osawa
 Yggdra Union: We'll Never Fight Alone – Pamela and Emilia
 Ys: The Oath in Felghana – Elena Stoddart

Drama CD
2009
 Koroshiya San – Kyuu Onna san
 Toradora! Drama CD Vol. 2 – Kihara Maya
 Drama CD Himawari – Ariesu
 Drama CD Persona – Ayase Yuka
 Bouso Rettou Seishun Hen – Chihou no Jidai ga Yatte Kita! – Higuchi Kyouko
 Transistor Teaset – Denki Gairozu – Ooshiro Kagami
 Yggdra Unison – Pamela, Emilia

2010
 MM! – Shizuka Sado

2011
 Puella Magi Madoka Magica – Kyoko Sakura

Dubbing

Live-action
 The Spy Next Door – Nora

Animation
 Chuggington – Koko
 High Guardian Spice – Sage

Discography

Singles

Albums

Compilation albums

DVDs
 Ai Pon the Films (Released March 3, 2007)
 Ai Nonaka's "No Tear x No Live 2008" (Released August 6, 2008)

References

External links 

  
 Official agency profile 
 Ai Nonaka at Starchild 
 

1981 births
Living people
Voice actresses from Fukuoka Prefecture
Voice actors from Fukuoka
Japanese video game actresses
Japanese voice actresses
King Records (Japan) artists
Musicians from Fukuoka Prefecture
21st-century Japanese actresses
21st-century Japanese women singers
21st-century Japanese singers
Aoni Production voice actors
Japanese YouTubers